Prom Queens is an American reality television series on Lifetime that premiered on September 20, 2012. It follows female high school students located all over the United States who are competing for the prom queen title. Lifetime announced that the series had been picked up for an eight episode first season on July 12, 2012. With the series debut acquiring low viewership, Lifetime burned off the series on November 6, 2012, and November 13, 2012, by airing two episodes short of the series' order back in July.

Episodes

References

External links

2010s American reality television series
2012 American television series debuts
2012 American television series endings
English-language television shows
Lifetime (TV network) original programming
Television series about teenagers
Television shows set in the United States
Prom